.
The Rocca Ubaldinesca or Castle of the Ubaldini is a relatively small Renaissance-style castle located in the town of Sassocorvaro Auditore, province of Pesaro, region of Marche, Italy. The castle, located on a hill overlooking the river Foglia, is peculiar for it turtle-like layout.

History
The present structure was commissioned by Federico da Montefeltro, Duke of Urbino to his architect Francesco di Giorgio Martini: the castle was built as a compact brick and stone building with tall sloping walls. The fort passed on to Ottaviano degli Ubaldini della Carda, brother of Duke Federico. The heraldic symbols in the castle belong to Ottaviano. The castle then passed to the Doria family of Genoa, who after 1511, became counts of Sassocorvaro.

The Counts of Sassocorvo died out in 1626, and the territory entered the Papal States. In 1706 the property was granted to Giovanni Cristoforo Battelli, Archbishop of Amasia, librarian and counselor to Pope Clement XI Albani.

Monsignor Battelli restored the castle, rebuilding a chapel and created a library. To the latter have been added papers and volumes from the Archbishopric. In the late 19th-century, the interiors were refurbished, creating a large hall, theater, and the interiors were decorated in 1895 by Enrico Mancini in a neoclassical style.

During the Second World War, the castle was used by Pasquale Rotondi to hide many works being targeted for looting by the Fascist armies. 

The castle now serves as the museum of the commune and includes an early 16th-century altarpiece depicting the Madonna and Child with Saints Sebastian, Roch and Nicolò by Evangelista da Pian di Meleto as well as Baroque paintings. It contains designs and works by Enrico Mancini (1867-1913), who also decorated the 19th-century Teatrino built into what was once the main hall of the fort.

References

External links
Official website

Ubaldinesca
Ubaldinesca
Buildings and structures in le Marche
Museums in Marche